Triodos Airport, also known as Triodhon Airport, is an airport in the regional unit of Messenia in Greece.

Triodos Airport was used for 20 years for civil aviation. Due to the need for a longer runway, on 19 July 1970 flying operations were transferred to the Kalamata International Airport. Today, it is used for ultralight aviation and by radio-controlled aircraft.

Facilities

Nearest airports
The three nearest airports are:

References

Defunct airports in Greece
Airports in Greece
Buildings and structures in Messenia
Transport infrastructure in Peloponnese (region)